1st Massachusetts may refer to:

1st Massachusetts Battery, a unit of field artillery during the American Civil War
1st Massachusetts Regiment, a unit of infantry during the American Revolutionary War
1st Massachusetts Volunteer Infantry, a unit of infantry during the American Civil War
1st Massachusetts Volunteer Cavalry Regiment, a unit of cavalry during the American Civil War
1st Massachusetts Volunteer Heavy Artillery, a unit of heavy artillery during the American Civil War